Şakir Eczacıbaşı (3 December 1929 – 24 January 2010), a second generation member of the notable Turkish Eczacıbaşı family, was a pharmacist, photographer and businessman.

He was awarded with the Chevaliers of the Ordre des Arts et des Lettres of France and the State Medal of Distinguished Service of Turkey. Şakir Eczacıbaşı served as the chairman of the board of directors of the Istanbul Foundation for Culture and Arts (IKSV) succeeding his brother Nejat in this post.

Biography 
He was born 1929 in Izmir, Turkey to Süleyman Ferit (1885 – April 18, 1973) and his wife Saffet Hanım as their last of seven sons, Nejat (1913–1993), Vedat (1916–1961), Sedat (1917–ca. 1950), Kemal (1918–1996), Haluk (1921–1996) and Melih (1923–2004).

He received a degree from the School of Pharmacy, University of London after he finished Robert College in Istanbul.

Following his return home, he worked as a journalist and published two magazines, "Sanat Yaprağı" (Art leaf) and "Tıpta Yenilikler" (Novelties in Medicine). He was responsible for the production of a series of presentation films about his family's company Eczacıbaşı. "Renk Duvarları" (Walls of color), a documentary film he produced in 1964 was honored with Council of Europe's "Cultural Films Awards". Şakir Eczacıbaşı was co-founder of the Turkish Cinemateque Association and its chairman for ten years long.

He served in the 1970s as the director general of Eczacıbaşı Pharmacy Co. In 1980, he was appointed CEO of the Rczacıbaşı Holding. After the death of his brother Nejat in 1993, he became the president of the Holding company. Finally, he resigned from active business career in 1996.

Şakir Eczacıbaşı was a photograph artist. He exhibited his works at 13 shows in Turkey and in 23 personal events abroad. He collected some of his photographs in the albums "Anılar/Moments" (Memories/Moments), "Türkiye Renkleri" (Colors of Turkey), "Kapılar Pencereler" (Doors Windows). He edited and contributed with his photographs to the calendars Eczacıbaşı company published since 1960.

He died on 24 January 2010 in Istanbul and was laid to rest at the Zincirlikuyu Cemetery. Şakir Eczacıbaşı was succeeded by his wife Saniha Sebla, he had married 48 years before.

Works

Magazines
 "Sanat Yaprağı" (Art leaf) – Supplement of newspaper Vatan, 1950s
 "Tıpta Yenilikler" – (Novelties in Medicine) 1950s
 "Yeni Sinema" – (1966–1970) Official periodical of the Turkish Cinemateque Association

Photography albums

Exhibition albums
 "Şakir Eczacıbaşı" – 1990
 "Şakir Eczacıbaşı" – 1996
 "Bir Seçki 1965–2005"

Encyclopedias
 "Eczacıbaşı Sanat Ansiklopedisi" (3 volumes) – 1998 –

Memories
 Çağrışımlar, Tanıklıklar, Dostluklar, Remzi Kitabevi, 2010.

Translation
 "Oyuncular: Players" – 2007 –
 "Bernard Shaw: Gülen Düşünceler" – 1995 – Translation from George Bernard Shaw
 "Oscar Wilde Tutkular, Acılar, Gülümseyen Deyişler" – 2004 – Translation from Oscar Wilde

Awards 
 Turkish State Medal of Distinguished Service

References

External links 
 Sanalmuze.org'da "Şakir Eczacıbaşı" fotoğrafları
 fotografya.gen.tr'de "Şakir Eczacıbaşı" yla yapılmış bir söyleşi
 fotograf.net'te "Şakir Eczacıbaşı"
 Belma Akçura'nın Şakir Eczacıbaşı'yla ilgili anı yazısı
 

1929 births
2010 deaths
Sakir
People from İzmir
Turkish pharmacists
Turkish photographers
Turkish businesspeople
Chevaliers of the Ordre des Arts et des Lettres
Robert College alumni
Alumni of the UCL School of Pharmacy
Burials at Zincirlikuyu Cemetery
Turkish chief executives
Recipients of the State Medal of Distinguished Service